Drift Falls, also known as Bust-Yer-Butt Falls and Driftwood Falls, is a waterfall located on private property Hwt 64  macon County, North Carolina.

History
Drift Falls flows on the Horsepasture River in the Jocassee Gorge.  The falls is an 80-ft. slide over bedrock to a deep pool, and is a part of a series of waterfalls along a 1,200-ft drop along the course of the river over a 2.5 mile stretch.  In the past, large numbers of visitors to the falls would cause traffic problems along North Carolina Highway 281 as they gathered at the falls to swim in the pool. Thrill seekers would use the falls as a natural waterslide, which is how the falls got its nickname of "Bust-Yer-Butt Falls.”

Nearby Falls
Little Falls — located on private property upstream from Drift Falls
Narrows Falls — located in a gated community upstream from Drift Falls
Rock House Falls — 55-ft falls located on private property on Burlingame Creek, a tributary of the Horsepasture River
Turtleback Falls
Rainbow Falls
Stairway Falls
Sidepocket Falls
Windy Falls

References

External links
NCWaterfalls.com Horsepasture River Falls Page 1

Waterfalls of North Carolina
Waterfalls of Transylvania County, North Carolina